Boiga bengkuluensis is a species of snake of the family Colubridae.

Geographic range
The snake is found in Southern Thailand, West Malaysia, and Indonesia (Sumatra and Bengkulu province).

References 

bengkuluensis
Reptiles described in 2003
Reptiles of Indonesia